Fat City is a novel by Leonard Gardner published in 1969. It is his only novel. Its prestige has grown since its publication, due to critical acclaim from Joan Didion and Walker Percy, among others. Denis Johnson cites it as a major influence on his writing. The book is widely considered a classic of boxing fiction.

Plot summary

Set in the small-time boxing circuit of Stockton, California, in the late 1950s, the novel concerns the revival of a semi-retired Billy Tully's career and the first fights of a novice, Ernie Munger. At twenty-nine years old and discouraged not only by his defeat to another lightweight fighter in Panama, but also from the desertion of his wife two years earlier, Tully meets and spars with Munger at the local YMCA and remarks on his talent, suggesting he visit his former trainer Ruben Luna.

Disgusted by his lack of fitness and power, Tully entertains the idea of returning to the ring in a bid to reclaim his self-respect and possibly his ex-wife. Munger meanwhile impregnates his girlfriend, Faye, and marries her out of obligation, vowing to support his young family by winning fights. After losing his first amateur bout he attains some success and, despite his anxieties about marriage, seems poised to ascend the circuit ranks. Tully, meanwhile is wracked by uncertainty and divides his time between working as a low-paying farm laborer and drinking heavily in seedy bars and motels. He relocates frequently to different hotels, due to non-payment of bills and disruptive behavior. After a brief affair with an alcoholic barfly named Oma, Tully strengthens his resolve and makes a concerted effort to prepare for a fight with a moderately well-known but aging Mexican fighter named Arcadio Lucero.

Tully narrowly wins the fight on a bill with Munger, who is also victorious in his professional debut. Though momentarily bolstered by his victory, Tully pines for Oma, his ex-wife, or any woman, realizing that his career is over and the past can not be reclaimed. He quarrels with Luna over payment for the fight (Luna has been advancing Tully money to pay for his hotel rooms) and is bitter with Luna over a perceived lack of support in his early career. Alone and without any future prospects, he descends into an abyss of inebriation, becoming just another unshaven face at the bar recalling former greatness. Munger continues to fight and, hitchhiking home from a fight in Salt Lake City alone, he is picked up by two young women who eject him from the car on a stretch of highway in the dark of night after an awkward exchange revealing Munger's lustful longing. The novel ends with the suggestion that Ernie Munger may be starting down the same desperate and well-worn path as Billy Tully.

Meaning of title
In a 1969 interview with Life, Leonard Gardner explained the meaning of the title.
"Lots of people have asked me about the title of my book. It's part of Negro slang. When you say you want to go to Fat City, it means you want the good life. I got the idea for the title after seeing a photograph of a tenement in an exhibit in San Francisco. 'Fat City' was scrawled in chalk on a wall. The title is ironic: Fat City is a crazy goal no one is ever going to reach."

Critical reception and influence
Kirkus Reviews wrote that Leonard "takes the tired saga of the second rate fighter and converts it into a vivid, gritty experience underlying the ultimate sadness of constricted, caught, despairing lives."

Of the novel, Denis Johnson has stated that "I studied Leonard Gardner's book so closely that I began to fear I'd never be able to write anything but imitations of it, so I swore it off" and that ten years later its influence was still strong: "I'd taught myself to write in Gardner's style, though not as well". Johnson's book Jesus' Son has been compared to Fat City in both its content and style.

Film adaptation
The novel was adapted into a celebrated film of the same name by John Huston in 1972.

References

External links
 "Personal Best: Fat City" by Denis Johnson

1969 American novels
American sports novels
Novels by Leonard Gardner
Novels about boxing
Novels set in California
Culture of Stockton, California
American novels adapted into films